Obesity Reviews is a monthly peer-reviewed medical journal, established in 2000, which publishes reviews on all obesity-related disciplines. It is the official journal of the World Obesity Federation and published on their behalf by Wiley-Blackwell. The editor-in-chief is David A. York (Utah State University).

Abstracting and indexing
The journal is abstracted and indexed in:

According to the Journal Citation Reports, the journal has a 2017 impact factor of 8.483.

References

External links 
 
 World Obesity Federation

Nutrition and dietetics journals
Wiley-Blackwell academic journals
Monthly journals
Publications established in 2000
English-language journals
Obesity journals